Bill Withers' Greatest Hits is a compilation album featuring a selection of early hits by Bill Withers, released in 1981.

Track listing 
 "Just the Two of Us" - 3:56
 "Use Me" - 3:45
 "Ain't No Sunshine" - 2:03
 "Lovely Day" - 4:14
 "I Want To Spend The Night" - 3:41
 "Soul Shadows" - 3:33
 "Lean On Me" - 4:17
 "Grandma's Hands" - 1:59
 "Hello Like Before" - 5:28
 "Who Is He (And What Is He to You)?" - 3:12

Charts

References

External links

Bill Withers compilation albums
1981 compilation albums
Columbia Records compilation albums